Lothar Richter (9 June 1912 – 20 November 2001) was a German international footballer.

References

1912 births
2001 deaths
Association football defenders
German footballers
Germany international footballers